Wulfsen is a municipality in the district of Harburg, in Lower Saxony, Germany.

See also 
 Wulfsen horse burial

References

Harburg (district)